JB Leonor, born Domingo Leonor III is a Filipino drummer and songwriter, best known as the co-founder of the Filipino rock/new wave band The Dawn. Leonor formed the band along with guitarist Teddy Diaz in 1986. As a songwriter, he wrote "I Stand With You" and co-wrote "Give Me the Night" with Jett Pangan.

Personal life
Leonor is married to Gina Ocampo. They have two children; Anika and Adriel Martin.

Studio albums
The Dawn
The Dawn (1986) 
I Stand With You (1988)
Beyond the Bend (1989)
Heart's Thunder (1990)
Abot Kamay (1992)
Puno't Dulo (1994) 
Prodigal Sun (2000)
Harapin (2004) 
Tulad ng Dati (2006) 
The Later Half of Day (2008)
Sound the Alarm (2009)

References

Living people
Filipino drummers
Year of birth missing (living people)